Thiorhodococcus alkaliphilus is a Gram-negative and phototrophic bacterium from the genus of Thiorhodococcus which has been isolated from sediments from a pond near the Nari Salt Pan in India.

References

External links
Type strain of Thiorhodococcus alkaliphilus at BacDive -  the Bacterial Diversity Metadatabase

Chromatiales
Bacteria described in 2017